Ileana Enculescu (born 28 October 1944) is a Romanian volleyball player. She competed in the women's tournament at the 1964 Summer Olympics.

References

1944 births
Living people
Romanian women's volleyball players
Olympic volleyball players of Romania
Volleyball players at the 1964 Summer Olympics
Sportspeople from Craiova